Sir Christopher Pegge M.D. (1765–1822) was an English physician.

Life
The son of Samuel Pegge the younger, by his first wife, he was born in London. He entered Christ Church, Oxford, as a commoner on 18 April 1782, and graduated B.A. on 23 February 1786. He was elected a Fellow of Oriel College in 1788, and graduated M.A. and M.B. there on 10 June and 18 July 1789. He returned to Christ Church, was appointed Lee's reader in anatomy there in 1790, and proceeded M.D. on 27 April 1792.

On 9 November 1790 Pegge became physician to the Radcliffe Infirmary, and a Fellow of the Royal Society in 1795. He was knighted on 26 June 1799, and in 1801 was appointed regius professor of physic at Oxford. He was elected a fellow of the Royal College of Physicians on 25 June 1796, delivered the Harveian oration in 1805, and became a censor in 1817.

Pegge left Oxford in 1816, and took a house in George Street, Hanover Square, for his health. Soon afterwards he moved on to Hastings. He had resigned his readership in 1816, but retained the regius professorship. He attended in the university, in accordance with the statutes, and died in Oxford, after an asthmatic seizure, on 3 August 1822. He was master of Ewelme Hospital, and was buried in Ewelme church, where he had an epitaph in the south aisle.

Notes

Attribution

1765 births
1822 deaths
18th-century English medical doctors
Fellows of Oriel College, Oxford
Fellows of the Royal Society
Medical doctors from London
Alumni of Christ Church, Oxford
Deaths from asthma
Fellows of the Royal College of Physicians
19th-century English medical doctors
Regius Professors of Medicine (University of Oxford)